The Gelignite Gang is a black and white 1956 British crime film directed by Terence Fisher and Francis Searle, starring Wayne Morris and Sandra Dorne. The film was released in the U.S. as The Dynamiters.

Plot
American insurance investigator Jimmy Baxter works for the Anglo American Investigation Company in England. He searches for a gang of jewel robbers who use gelignite as part of their modus operandi. He goes to The Green Dragon Club to interview its owner Mr Popoulos. After he leaves the head waiter Bergman calls him from a phone box but is shot dead by an unseen assailant before he can say much.

Baxter is more successful than his boss at chatting up the office secretary, Sally, and asks her to dinner at the Green Dragon Club.

Sally does some sleuthing on her own and finds valuable clues. Baxter tracks the gang to its lair, but then Sally is kidnapped by Mr. G, the gang's secret mastermind and tied up in a warehouse.

Initially the old pawnbroker appears to be the mastermind. The gang are tracked to his pawn shop and when they fail to shoot their way out they set fire to the building. Ultimately Mr G appears to be Rutherford, the boss of Anglo American.

Cast
 Wayne Morris as Jimmy Baxter
 James Kenney as Chris Chapman
 Patrick Holt as John Rutherford
 Sandra Dorne as Sally Morton
 Simone Silva as Simone
 Eric Pohlmann as Mr. Popoulus
 Lloyd Lamble as Detective-Inspector Felby
 Arthur Young as Pop Scobie
 Tony Doonan as Jagar
 Hugh Miller as Mr. Crosby
 Mark Daly as 1st Watchman
 Monti De Lyle as Barton, 'Bergman'	
 Bernadette Milnes as Kay Mallen	
 Bertha Russell as Mrs Chapman	
 Ossie Morris as 2nd watchman
 Leigh Crutchley as Hopman
 Herbert St John as Mr. Woodgate

References

External links

British crime films
British heist films
1956 films
1950s gang films
Films directed by Terence Fisher
Films directed by Francis Searle
Films shot in London
Films set in London
1950s English-language films
1950s British films
1956 crime films
British black-and-white films